The Queen of Sheba (1921) is a silent drama film produced by Fox studios about the story of the ill-fated romance between Solomon, King of Israel, and the Queen of Sheba. Written and directed by J. Gordon Edwards, it starred Betty Blythe as the Queen and Fritz Leiber Sr. as King Solomon. The film is well known amongst silent film buffs for the risqué costumes worn by Blythe, as evidenced by several surviving stills taken during the production. Only a short fragment of the film survives.

Cast

Production
The film was originally intended for Theda Bara. However Bara chose not to renew her contract and, after making the ill-fated Kathleen Mavourneen, she all but retired from filmmaking. While making Mavourneen, construction began on sets for The Queen of Sheba. Not wanting it to go to waste, William Fox chose to put Betty Blythe in the role. The film became a hit but Blythe never matched its success with her later films.

The topless scenes filmed in this movie were seen only in European release versions of the movie.

Preservation
The film is presumed lost. A 1937 New Jersey vault fire destroyed most of the Fox silent film negatives and prints, and it is unlikely a copy of The Queen of Sheba still exists. However, in May 2011, a 17-second fragment was found, and initially mistakenly identified as from Cleopatra (1917), though comparison with stills from the movie have since led to it being identified correctly.

See also
List of incomplete or partially lost films
List of lost films
Nudity in film

References

External links

17 second fragment from the film at the Internet Archive
 of Fox Film fire facility in Little Ferry, New Jersey, in which the camera negative and last prints of The Queen of Sheba most likely perished
Foreign release lobby poster

1921 films
Films about religion
American black-and-white films
American silent feature films
Films directed by J. Gordon Edwards
Films about Solomon
Fox Film films
Lost American films
Sheba
Silent American drama films
1921 drama films
1921 lost films
Lost drama films
1920s American films
Silent horror films